Bob's Your Uncle is a 1942 British comedy film directed by Oswald Mitchell and starring Albert Modley, Jean Colin, George Bolton, Wally Patch, and H.F. Maltby. It depicts the enthusiastic members of a Home Guard unit.

It was shot at Welwyn Studios.

Premise
Home guardsman Albert is in love with Dolly, the daughter of commanding officer Diehard. In order to impress her, Albert tries to raise funds to buy a tank for the village.

Cast
 Albert Modley - Albert Smith
 Jean Colin - Dolly Diehard
 George Bolton - Jeff Smith
 Wally Patch - Sergeant Brownfoot
 H. F. Maltby - Major Diehard
 Johnnie Schofield - Stationmaster
 Bert Linden - Corporal Nelson
 Alfred Wright - Pim's Comedy Navy

Critical reception
Allmovie wrote, "One can gauge the subtlety of Bob's Your Uncle by its character names: Dolly Diehard, Sgt. Brownfoot etc."

References

External links

1942 films
1942 comedy films
British comedy films
British black-and-white films
Films set in England
Films shot at Welwyn Studios
Films directed by Oswald Mitchell
Films scored by Percival Mackey
1940s English-language films
1940s British films